Cotyachryson is a genus of round-necked longhorns beetle in the subfamily Cerambycinae of the family Cerambycidae.

Species
 Cotyachryson inspergatus Faimaire & Germain, 1898
 Cotyachryson philippii (Porter, 1925)
 Cotyachryson sulcicorne (Germain, 1898)

References
 Biolib
 Gwannon
 Miguel A. Monné, Larry G. Bezark Checklist of the Cerambycidae, or longhorned beetles (Coleoptera) of the Western Hemisphere
 Cerambycidae de chile

Achrysonini